The Lake Placid Olympic Sports Complex Cross Country Biathlon Center is a venue located in the Lake Placid Olympic Sports Complex at Lake Placid, New York. During the 1980 Winter Olympics, it hosted the biathlon, cross-country skiing, and the cross-country skiing portion of the Nordic combined events.

It also plays hosts to a ski marathon called the Lake Placid Loppet, that takes places in early February.

References

1980 Winter Olympics official report Volume 1. pp. 29–35, 39–42.
Cross Country Biathlon Center at Lake Placid profile
Lake Placid Loppet information

Venues of the 1980 Winter Olympics
Olympic biathlon venues
Olympic cross-country skiing venues
Olympic Nordic combined venues
Sports venues in New York (state)
Sports venues in Essex County, New York
Ski stadiums in the United States
Skiing in New York (state)
1978 establishments in New York (state)
Sports venues completed in 1978